Nonthawan “Maeya” Chanvanathorn (27 April 1992) is a Thai actress, TV Presenter, model and beauty pageant titleholder who was crowned Miss Thailand World 2014 and represented Thailand at Miss World 2014 placed top 11.  Nonthawan's selection as Miss Thailand World was unusual in that she had a darker complexion than most contestants. This sparked discussion regarding Thai society's perceptions of skin colour and beauty. In  August 2014, Maeya helped to raise awareness of the disease ALS by participating in the Ice Bucket Challenge.

Education
After the pageant  Nonthawan continued  her studies at Stamford International University. She studied to obtain a Bachelor of Business Administration in Stamford's International Airlines Business Management course.  She received her graduation certificate from the Stamford program in January 2015.

Appearances

Television

Dramas

Single

References

External links
 Miss World

Living people
1992 births
Miss World 2014 delegates
Nonthawan Bramaz
Nonthawan Bramaz
Miss Thailand World